The following is a list of the 21 cantons of the Seine-Saint-Denis department, in France, following the French canton reorganisation which came into effect in March 2015:

 Aubervilliers
 Aulnay-sous-Bois
 Bagnolet
 Le Blanc-Mesnil
 Bobigny
 Bondy
 La Courneuve
 Drancy
 Épinay-sur-Seine
 Gagny
 Livry-Gargan
 Montreuil-1
 Montreuil-2
 Noisy-le-Grand
 Pantin
 Saint-Denis-1
 Saint-Denis-2
 Saint-Ouen-sur-Seine
 Sevran
 Tremblay-en-France
 Villemomble

References

 

ca:Districte de Bobigny